Rauf & Faik (Рауф и Фаик) are a Azerbaijani pop duet, formed by twin brothers Rauf and Faik Mirzaev (Russian: Рауф и Фаик Мирзаевы) (born July 7, 1999; Izhevsk, Russia). They are best known for their Russian-language #1 single "Childhood" (Russian: Детство), released in 2018. They release music sung in both Russian and English, though they also speak Azerbaijani.

Biography 
The brothers are ethnically Azerbaijani. According to the brothers, they have always had a fascination with music, as they inherited musical talent from their maternal grandfather, who they knew as an opera singer and a director at an opera house in Baku. They began to study music at the age of 4; their neighbour saw that they were talented and offered to take them to a music-focused college, where they played the piano until 8 years old, where they transitioned to vocals. They later sung with the House of Children's Creativity (Russian: Доме детского творчества) and music studio Above the Rainbow (Russian: Выше радуги). According to the channel "Music First" (Russian: Музыки первого) their vocal range is 4 1/2 octaves.

They grew up listening to 90s Soul, R&B, and Pop and music, citing Brian McKnight and Michael Jackson. More recently, they have commented on receiving inspiration from western artists such as XXXTentacion, who they consider very inspiring, and to a lesser degree, Post Malone; though their profile on Music First also lists Sam Smith.
XXXTentacion, according to Faik, means a lot to them and very inspiring. At the beginning of Childhood music video, a Tupac Shakur reference is seen. 
Before focusing entirely on music (2014-2018), they worked as singers in a cafe.

Music 
Their first music video — released for the song "Evenings" (Russian: Вечера) — amassed several hundred thousand views, and thousands of likes, resulting in offers to sing at multiple venues. A later music video for the song "I Love You" (Russian: Я люблю тебя), became the 28th most popular song of 2018 on the Russian social networking site VKontakte.

Their debut album, also titled "I Love You", was released later in September, 2018. According to the brothers, they invested only 1,500 Rubles (approx. $25) into advertising the album. Despite little inherent publicity, the song "Childhood" (Russian: Детство) reached number one on VKontakte.

"Pain & Memories", their second studio album, released on March 15, 2019, and quickly reached 8th place on Apple Music.

Since beginning their professional music career, the brothers have toured in over 20 Russian cities, Estonia, Finland, Sweden, and Germany.

Discography

Album

Single

References

Russian musicians
Russian hip hop musicians